Paul Verhoeven (born 15 January 1983) is an Australian broadcaster, writer, blogger and comedian, and the host of Steam Punks on ABC3.

Early life
Verhoeven’s father, John Verhoeven, was an officer in the New South Wales Police Force. Verhoeven grew up with his family on Sydney's northern beaches, before he moved to Melbourne after completing a Bachelor of Film Studies at the University of New South Wales.

Radio 
Verhoeven is best known for his extensive work with Triple J, as the host of the "Nerdy By Nature" segment on The Breakfast Show with Tom Ballard and Alex Dyson (formerly known as "Nerds of a Feather" and "Close Encounters of the Nerd Kind"). He also hosted The Mid-Dawn show for four years, and was producer of The Graveyard Shift with Dave Callan. Verhoeven has also hosted "The Breakfast Show", "Weekend Arvos" and the Triple J Weekend Breakfast Show.

Television 
Verhoeven is the host and co-writer of Steam Punks, a narrative game show on ABC 3, produced by Beyond Entertainment.

He is a regular guest on Channel 10's The Project, Studio 3 on ABC 3, and has appeared on Good Game. He also makes regular appearances on the Melbourne community TV station Channel 31. He was also a presenter on two seasons of Save Point, a gaming show on ONE HD, which began its second season in 2012.

Verhoeven co-hosted and wrote for the Planet Nerd, a geek comedy RMITV program broadcast on Channel 31 Melbourne, which was nominated for Best Comedy Program in the 2008 Antenna Awards. He wrote and presented an online television series entitled Curiageous, a comedic mythbusting series, for the Australian online news site, The Vine.

Comedy 
Verhoeven made his solo comedy debut in the show, Tell Me Lies, at the 2014 Melbourne Fringe Festival. He reprised it at the 2015 Melbourne International Comedy Festival, where The Sydney Morning Herald awarded it four stars, calling it "an engaging night of comedy, from a very enjoyable performer who left the audience wanting more." He also performed in the 2014 Melbourne Fringe Festival production of Watson: Who's Afraid of the Dark, which went on to win a Fringe Award for Best Comedy that year.

Online and other work 
Verhoeven is a long-running senior contributor to The Vine. He is also writer and artist of Lessons for Children, a weekly syndicated web comic. He has been a regular contributor for Yen Magazine, a pop culture critic for Junkee, is a game critic for MMGN, and has written for Filmink magazine, Triple J Magazine and Horse and Hound. In March 2015, together with artist and comedian Kris Straub he created the ongoing gaming podcast 28 Plays Later, which he co-hosts.

Verhoeven runs a YouTube channel with a focus on the BBC sci-fi drama Doctor Who, giving opinions, reviews and speculation, as well as branching out into discussion on other topics such as equality in video games and dog impressions. His TEDx talk, entitled 'Sexism in Gaming', garnered a great deal of attention in early 2014.

Verhoeven has become quite well known for his true crime book called Loose Units, released in 2018, which includes tales from both his father, John Verhoeven's, career experiences (including the New South Wales Police Force), and other careers throughout their lives. A companion crime podcast (2018-present) including conversations between the father and son is also available. A new book, Electric Blue, was released in 2020.

Personal life 
Verhoeven was one of Cleo's Top 50 Bachelors of the Year for 2011, and was named as the second runner up. He married Tegan Higginbotham in a civil ceremony in Paris in July 2019.

References

External links 
 Paul Verhoeven's page on Triple J
 Curiageous, presented by Paul Verhoeven on The Vine TV
  The official Nerds of a Feather page on the Triple J homepage
 Lords of Luxury podcast
 Lessons for Children comics archive
 YouTube Channel
 

Bloggers from Melbourne
Australian television presenters
Triple J announcers
Living people
1983 births
RMITV alumni